Mendora is a mandal in Nizamabad district in the state of Telangana in India. Mendora is situated beside NH 7. There are 1306 houses in Mendora. It is located 54 km towards East from District headquarters Nizamabad.

Demographics 
Total Population in 2011 census is approximately 4981 of whom 2431 are male and 2550 are female. Average Sex Ratio of Mendora village is 1049 which is higher than the national   average. There are 450 children of age group 0 to 6 years. Among them 237 are boys and 213 are girls.

Work profile 
In Mendora village out of total population, 2945 were engaged in work activities. 82.55% of workers describe their work as Main Work (Employment or Earning more than 6 Months) while 17.45% were involved in Marginal activity providing livelihood for less than 6 months. Of 2945 workers engaged in Main Work, 854 were cultivators (owner or co-owner) while 913 were Agricultural labourer.

Geography 
Coordinates: 18°57′N 78°24′E

References 

Mandals in Nizamabad district